André Filipe da Luz Horta (born 7 November 1996) is a Portuguese professional footballer who plays for S.C. Braga as a midfielder.

He made over 140 Primeira Liga appearances for Vitória de Setúbal, Benfica and Braga, winning a league and cup double with the second of those teams in 2017 as well as the Taça de Portugal and Taça da Liga with the third. He also played for a year at Los Angeles FC in Major League Soccer.

Club career

Vitória Setúbal
Born in Almada, Setúbal District, Horta spent eight years in S.L. Benfica's youth system, joining local Vitória F.C. at the age of 15. In late 2014, whilst still a junior, he was promoted to the first team by manager Domingos Paciência.

Horta made his first-team and Primeira Liga debut on 12 December 2014, playing the second 45 minutes of a 0–1 home loss against Boavista FC. He finished his first full season with 32 games – 21 starts – and two goals, helping his team narrowly avoid relegation; his goals contributed to wins at C.F. Os Belenenses and C.D. Tondela in December 2015.

Benfica
On 1 June 2016, Horta signed a five-year contract with defending champions Benfica. He played his first competitive match on 7 August, featuring the full 90 minutes in a 3–0 victory over S.C. Braga in the Supertaça Cândido de Oliveira. Six days later, on his league debut, he scored his only goal of 14 appearances that campaign, concluding a 2–0 win at Tondela.

Horta joined Braga on a season-long loan deal on 30 August 2017. He scored once in 22 competitive matches during his tenure, wrapping up a 3–1 away defeat of Boavista on 3 January 2018.

Los Angeles FC
Horta agreed to join Los Angeles FC on 27 March 2018, as their final Designated Player ahead of their inaugural season in Major League Soccer. The deal was made effective on 23 June that year, and he made his league debut on 27 July when he came on as a 77th-minute substitute for scorer Lee Nguyen against the LA Galaxy, his backpass nine minutes later resulting in Ola Kamara's 2–2 equaliser (final score).

Braga
On 10 June 2019, Horta returned to Portugal and Braga on a five-year deal, for a reported fee of $2.75 million and 50% of any future transfer. In his first games back at the club in August, he scored his first European goals in each leg of a 7–3 aggregate defeat of Brøndby IF in the third qualifying round of the UEFA Europa League. He made three appearances in the Taça da Liga for the eventual winners, scoring in the 2–1 group stage win over C.S. Marítimo.

Horta played six games as Braga won the 2020–21 Taça de Portugal, coming off the bench in four of them including the 2–0 final victory against Benfica. On 23 December, he and Abel Ruiz were sent off as the team's defence of the trophy ended with a 1–0 loss at neighbours F.C. Vizela in the last 16.

In June 2022, Horta extended his contract to 2027, with a buyout clause of €30 million. The news was announced through a video of him conducting a performance of "The Show Must Go On" at Braga's Theatre Circo.

International career
Horta earned 28 caps for Portugal across all youth levels, scoring five goals. He made his debut on 25 March 2014 in a friendly 4–2 win for the under-18 team against Belgium in Santarém, and scored his first goal in a 2–2 draw against the same opponents two days later. While he never went to a major tournament, he scored in 2019 UEFA European Under-21 Championship qualification victories over Switzerland, Wales and Bosnia and Herzegovina for his side in 2018.

Personal life
Horta's older brother, Ricardo, is also a footballer. They played together at Benfica, Vitória de Setúbal and Braga.

Honours
Benfica
Primeira Liga: 2016–17
Taça de Portugal: 2016–17
Supertaça Cândido de Oliveira: 2016

Braga
Taça de Portugal: 2020–21
Taça da Liga: 2019–20

References

External links

1996 births
Living people
Sportspeople from Almada
Portuguese footballers
Association football midfielders
Primeira Liga players
Vitória F.C. players
S.L. Benfica footballers
S.C. Braga players
Major League Soccer players
Designated Players (MLS)
Los Angeles FC players
Portugal youth international footballers
Portugal under-21 international footballers
Portuguese expatriate footballers
Expatriate soccer players in the United States
Portuguese expatriate sportspeople in the United States